Babamist was a stallion that had a profound impact on the American breeding industry, especially in the sport of eventing.

Babamist was foaled in Maryland, and ran in steeplechases for four years before his breeding career. His record was not particularly exceptional: out of 13 starts he had a record of 5-0-1 and earnings of $10,620. He later was used as a fox hunter, show jumper, and eventer.

Pedigree

Offspring

Babamist is legendary as a producer of event horses. He is one of only a few American stallions to consistently produce offspring who compete at the top level of eventing.

Offspring include:

 Heyday - Pam Am Gold Medalist, Olympic Silver Medalist
 Little Tricky
 Snowy River - Member of US Equestrian Team at 1997 European Championships
 Mystic High - 1988 USCTA mare of the year
 Good Force
 Arctic Mist
 My Turn
 Camacasie 
 Solimist
 Dynamite II

References

External links
"Babamist"  - Additional pedigree information

Show jumping horses
Eventing horses
Sport horse sires
1969 animal births
Individual male horses